Adam Hague (born 29 August 1997) is an English athlete specialising in the pole vault. He won gold medal at the 2015 European Junior Championships. In addition, he competed at the 2018 Commonwealth Games finishing fourth. Four years later, at the 2022 Commonwealth Games, he won his first senior medal, a silver in the pole vault.

His personal bests in the event are 5.65 metres outdoors (Berlin 2018) and 5.65 metres indoors (Birmingham 2018).

International competitions

References

External links
 
 
 
 

1997 births
Living people
English male pole vaulters
British male pole vaulters
Sportspeople from Sheffield
Commonwealth Games competitors for England
Athletes (track and field) at the 2018 Commonwealth Games
Athletes (track and field) at the 2022 Commonwealth Games
Commonwealth Games silver medallists for England
Commonwealth Games medallists in athletics
Medallists at the 2022 Commonwealth Games